Anemone tuberosa, the desert anemone or tuber anemone, is a herbaceous species of flowering plant  buttercup family Ranunculaceae. Plants with 1 to 3 basal leaves that are 1 or 2 times ternate. The basal leaves few with long petioles and deeply 3-parted with leaflets lacking stems or rarely with a stalk. The plants produce one peduncle with one solitary flower or 2–5 flowered cymes.

This spring flowering plant is found on rocky slopes and along stream banks. Anemone tuberosa is part of a species complex that includes 6 to 9 species native from south western and central USA to South America For the most part all produce tubers or caudex-like tubers.

References

External links

Jepson Manual Treatment
Photo gallery

tuberosa
Flora of the Southwestern United States
Flora of Northwestern Mexico